Pietro Leonardi (born 29 December 1963 in Rome) is an Italian businessman, who served as sporting and managing director of Italian association football club Parma F.C. until 4 March 2015. After the bankruptcy of Parma, he joined Latina. However, he resigned after he was banned from football activities for 5-year by the FIGC, for his mismanagement in Parma.

Career
He began his career as sporting director at Polisportiva Monterotondo Calcio, where he spent three seasons in Serie D in the early 1990s. After a brief spell at L'Aquila Calcio, he went to Empoli, who played in Serie B, with whom he achieved promotion to Serie A. He then spent a few months at Calcio Savoia, before moving to Juventus in 2000, taking up the position as the director of youth development. He left the Turin-based side in 2004 became director-general at Reggiana, before moving to Udinese, to Cisco Roma and back to Udinese again. In June 2009, he joined Parma. He was initially appointed general manager, but promoted to managing director in October 2009 by the shareholders and was given the power to sign players and control the finances after a successful start under his stewardship.

References

Living people
1963 births
Businesspeople from Rome
Parma Calcio 1913
Latina Calcio 1932